Paraguay at the Pan American Games.

Medal count

Medals by sport

References

 
Pan American Games